Just A Dash (1977 – 2 November 2012) was a notable Australian Thoroughbred racehorse, who won the 1981 Melbourne Cup.

He was sired by Whiskey Road (USA). His dam Native Lass (AUS) was by Caranna (AUS).

The horse won the race by 2 ¼ lengths providing Tommy Smith with just his second Melbourne Cup. He was ridden by Peter Cook whose father Billy Cook had himself ridden two previous winners of the race.

Just A Dash was also victorious in the 1981 SAJC Adelaide Cup and the SAJC St. Leger Stakes.

He was put down at Willow Dene Stud near Wollongong at the age of 35 in late 2012. Until his death, he was the oldest surviving Melbourne Cup winner.

References

1977 racehorse births
2012 racehorse deaths
Racehorses bred in Australia
Racehorses trained in Australia
Melbourne Cup winners
Thoroughbred family 1-n